"Unut Sevme" is Turkish singer Candan Erçetin's first single. It was released as a limited number of 2500 copies, of which all signed by her. The song is written by Baki Çallıoğlu  and previously sung by Güzide Kasacı during 1960s.

Track listing
"Album Version" - 4:38
"Funky House Mix (Radio Edit)" - 5:03
"Afro-Orient Percussion Mix (Radio Mix)" - 4:12
"Latin House Mix (Radio Edit)" - 4:35
"Funky House Mix (Extended Version)" - 5:48
"Afro-Orient Percussion Mix (Extended Version)" - 5:35
"Latin House Mix (Extended Version)" - 7:49

References 

Candan Erçetin songs
2001 singles
2001 songs